The Sudarshan Rangamanch is a theatre organization located in Pune, Maharashtra. It is run by the 'Maharashtra Cultural Center', a leading public charitable trust active in cultural activities. The Institution was established on 5 October 1965. Its past presidents were Smt. Yamutai Kirloskar, Dr. Pabalkar, Smt. Dr. Suru, Smt. Jyotsna Bhole. At present,  the well-known actor Dr. Mohan Agashe is heading the institution.

The trust has its own mini-theatre as well as an art gallery. Many amateur theatre groups perform their plays, music and dance programmes at Sudarshan Rangmanch.

External links 
 Official website of Maharashtra Cultural Centre

Culture of Pune